Basri (also Romanized as Başrī) is a village in Dashti-ye Esmail Khani Rural District, Ab Pakhsh District, Dashtestan County, Bushehr Province, Iran. At the 2010 census, its population was 174, in 41 families.

References 

Populated places in Dashtestan County